Gordon Fung Siu-yuen, QPM, CPM, SBS is a retired Hong Kong police officer. He was awarded the Silver Bauhinia Star in recognition of his long and exemplary service to the Government of Hong Kong.

Gordon Fung Siu-yuen served on the Hong Kong Police Force for 36 years. He retired in 2008 as the Deputy Police Commissioner & Director of Management Services.

External links
http://english.peopledaily.com.cn/english/200102/22/eng20010222_63082.html
http://www.police.gov.hk/offbeat/622/news1.h
http://www.police.gov.hk/offbeat/874/eng/p01.htm
http://www.police.gov.hk/offbeat/667/018_e.htm
http://www.police.gov.hk/offbeat/610/enews2.html

Year of birth missing (living people)
Hong Kong police officers
Hong Kong civil servants
Living people
Hong Kong recipients of the Queen's Police Medal
Recipients of the Silver Bauhinia Star